The 2019–20 season was Wycombe Wanderers' 133rd season in existence and their 27th consecutive season in the Football League. This was the club's second consecutive season in EFL League One. The club earned promotion to the EFL Championship on 13 July 2020, beating Oxford United 2–1 in the 2020 EFL League One play-off Final at Wembley Stadium.

Friendlies

Pre-season
Wycombe Wanderers announced on 13 May 2019 that they will face Barnet and Woking during pre-season. Their full schedule was confirmed on 31 May.

Mid-season

Competitions

League One

League table

Results summary

Results by matchday

Matches
On Thursday, 20 June 2019, the EFL League One fixtures were revealed.

League One play-offs

On 9 June 2020, League One clubs voted by an overwhelming majority to curtail the 2019–20 season early due to the COVID-19 pandemic in the United Kingdom. It was announced the same day that the play-offs would still be played and that positions would be determined on a points per game (PPG) basis. This meant that Wycombe Wanderers finished 3rd in the League One table, thus occupying the first play-off spot.

FA Cup

The first round draw was made on 21 October 2019.

EFL Cup

The first round draw was made on 20 June.

EFL Trophy

On 9 July 2019, the group-stage draw was announced with invited clubs drawn on 12 July 2019.

Berks & Bucks FA Senior Cup 

On 13 August 2019, Wycombe Wanderers confirmed that they would take part in the BBFA Senior Cup for the first time since 2014 having won it 29 times. Since they are a League (EFL) member, they were given a bye to the Quarter Finals. The draw was made after the 2nd round matches had been completed, with Wycombe Wanderers being drawn against Hungerford Town of the National League South. Wycombe won 3–0 against Hungerford to set up a tie with Spartan South Midlands Premier Division side Newport Pagnell Town On 17 April 2020, the Berks & Bucks Football Association announced that the competition had been cancelled and all results would be expunged due to the 2019–20 COVID-19 pandemic.

Team details
Squad information

 Loan player

Appearances and goals

|-
|colspan="16"|Players who left the club before the end of the season:''

|}

Transfers

Transfers in

Loans in

Transfers out

Loans out

References

Wycombe Wanderers
Wycombe Wanderers F.C. seasons